Gomphus calakmulensis is a species of fungus in the genus Gomphus, family Gomphaceae. It has been recorded from Calakmul in Campeche province in Mexico.

References

External links

Fungi of Mexico
Fungi described in 2010
Gomphaceae
Fungi without expected TNC conservation status